Troublesome Night 13 is a 2002 Hong Kong horror comedy film produced by Nam Yin and directed by Chan Yiu-ming. It is the 13th of the 20 films in the Troublesome Night film series.

Plot
Chow Ka-ho's father runs a big business in Thailand. Lik and May, a pair of siblings, work for him. One day, overcome by lust, Chow Ka-ho rapes and murders May and then buries her body in a secret location before fleeing back to Hong Kong. Chow's friends – Bud Yan and his cousin Bud Gay, and the Lai brothers – go on a trip to Thailand. At the hotel, they meet an attractive receptionist, Hok, and get her to be their tour guide. Bud Yan has a one-night stand with Hok.

One day, while riding a banana boat at the beach, the boat suddenly capsizes and Bud Gay almost drowns. In his subconscious state, he encounters May's ghost, who gives him a gold chain with her spirit attached to it. May's ghost follows Bud Gay back to Hong Kong to seek revenge on Chow. At the same time, Hok also tracks down Bud Yan in Hong Kong and insists on being his girlfriend.

After encountering May's ghost, a fearful Chow seeks help from Bud Gay's mother, the expert ghostbuster Mrs Bud Lung. He lies to her that he killed May by accident and feels guilty about it. Mrs Bud Lung manages to subdue and capture May's ghost. In the meantime, Lik and his friend Mint, a novice ghostbuster, show up in Hong Kong and try to save May's ghost but Mint is no match for Mrs Bud Lung. Lik and Mint then plead with Mrs Bud Lung to release May's ghost; Mrs Bud Lung agrees and May's ghost tells everyone the truth behind her death. Chow tries to flee when his lies are exposed but eventually gets his just deserts in a fatal car accident. The rest return to Thailand, unearth May's remains and lay her to rest in a proper funeral.

Cast
 Law Lan as Mrs Bud Lung
 Ken Wong as Lik
 Zoie Tam as May
 Anita Chan as Hok
 Ronnie Cheung as Bud Yan
 Tong Ka-fai as Bud Gay
 Crystal Cheung as Mint
 Yu Ka-ho as Chow Ka-ho
 Onitsuka as Lai Chor-pat
 Mr Nine as Lai Chor-kau
 Ma Arissara Sitthi Sarankil as Sister Ling
 Jass Chan as hotel receptionist

External links
 
 

Hong Kong comedy horror films
2000s Cantonese-language films
2002 comedy horror films
2002 films
Troublesome Night (film series)
2000s Hong Kong films